La Pava is a corregimiento in Olá District, Coclé Province, Panama with a population of 1,444 as of 2010. Its population as of 1990 was 1,173; its population as of 2000 was 1,297.

References

Corregimientos of Coclé Province